Alsatian ( or  "Alsatian German"; Lorraine Franconian: Elsässerdeitsch; ;  or ) is the group of Alemannic German dialects spoken in most of Alsace, a formerly disputed region in eastern France that has passed between French and German control five times since 1681.

Language family
Alsatian is closely related to other nearby Alemannic dialects, such as Swiss German, Swabian, and Markgräflerisch as well as Kaiserstühlerisch. It is often confused with Lorraine Franconian, a more distantly related Franconian dialect spoken in the northwest corner of Alsace and in neighbouring Lorraine. Like other dialects and languages, Alsatian has also been influenced by outside sources. Words of Yiddish origin can be found in Alsatian, and modern conversational Alsatian includes adaptations of French words and English words, especially concerning new technologies.

Many speakers of Alsatian could, if necessary, write in reasonable standard German. For most this would be rare and confined to those who have learned German at school or through work. As with other dialects, various factors determine when, where, and with whom one might converse in Alsatian. Some dialect speakers are unwilling to speak standard German, at times, to certain outsiders and prefer to use French. In contrast, many people living near the border with Basel, Switzerland, will speak their dialect with a Swiss person from that area, as they are mutually intelligible for the most part; similar habits may apply to conversations with people of the nearby German Markgräflerland. Some street names in Alsace may use Alsatian spellings (they were formerly displayed only in French but are now bilingual in some places, especially Strasbourg and Mulhouse).

Speakers

Status of Alsatian in France 

Since 1992, the constitution of the Fifth Republic states that French is the official language of the Republic. However, Alsatian, along with other regional languages, is recognized by the French government in the official list of languages of France.  France is a signatory to the European Charter for Regional or Minority Languages but has never ratified the law and has not given regional languages the support that would be required by the charter.  The policies of the Paris government have had the deliberate effect of greatly weakening the prevalence of native languages in France that are not "French".  As a result, Alsatian has gone from being the prevalent language of the region to one in decline.  A 1999 INSEE survey counted 548,000 adult speakers of Alsatian in France, making it the second most-spoken regional language in the country (after Occitan). Like all regional languages in France, however, the transmission of Alsatian is declining. While 43% of the adult population of Alsace speaks Alsatian, its use has been largely declining amongst the youngest generations.

A dialect of Alsatian German is spoken in the United States by a group known as the Swiss Amish, whose ancestors emigrated there in the middle of the 19th century. The approximately 7,000 speakers are located mainly in Allen County, Indiana, with "daughter settlements" elsewhere.

Orthography

C, Q, and X are only used in loanwords. Y is also used in native words, but is more common in loanwords.

Orthal
Orthal (Orthographe alsacienne) is a revised orthography meant for use by all dialects of Alsatian promoted by the Office pour la Langue et les Cultures d'Alsace et de Moselle (OLCA).

The latest version (2016) of Orthal is described below. Not all dialects are expected to use all letters & diacritics. For example, Owerlandisch from Southern Alsace primarily uses the additional vowel letters, Ä À Ì Ü.

Dialects from the north (Strasbourg region) make use of more letters including Ë, Ö, Ù and the diphthong ÈI.

In general the principles of Orthal are to:
 Follow standard German orthography for the regular vowels A, E, I, O, U and their Umlauted Standard German forms Ä, Ö, Ü
 For Diphthongs & Triphthong that do not exist in Standard German Orthal combines standard German letters to create anew – e.g., ia, üe (or üa), öi, àui, äi (or èi)
 For vowel sounds not represented in the Standard German orthography, it uses the French acute & grave accent marks to create new graphemes that can represent sounds unique to the Alsatian dialects
 It also follows standard German orthography for consonants as well.

The vowels are pronounced short or long based on their position in the syllable besides the letter type.

A vowel at the end of a syllable, without a subsequent consonant, is a long vowel "V" = Long Vowel (LV). e.g., hà, sì

A vowel followed by a single consonant in a syllable is pronounced as a long vowel "V + C" = Long Vowel (LV). e.g., Ros

Note – A vowel followed by several consonants ("V + C + C") in a syllable is pronounced as a Short Vowel. e.g., Ross

Monophthong – short vowels

Monophthong – long vowels

Phonology

Consonants
Alsatian has a set of 19 consonants:

Three consonants are restricted in their distribution:  and  only occur at the beginning of a word or morpheme, and then only if followed immediately by a vowel;  never occurs at the beginning of a word or morpheme.

Alsatian, like some German dialects, has lenited all obstruents but . Its lenes are, however, voiceless as in all Southern German varieties. Speakers of French tend to hear them as their , which also are voiceless and unaspirated.

In southern dialects, there is a tendency to pronounce it  in all positions, and in Strasbourg the palatal allophone tends to conflate with the phoneme .

Vowels

Short vowels:  ( in Strasbourg), .

Long vowels:

Diphthongs

Grammar 
Alsatian nouns inflect by case, gender and number:
 Three cases: nominative, accusative, dative. Unlike Standard German, Alsatian does not have a genitive case and instead utilises the dative or the preposition vu ("of", German "von") plus the dative to fulfill that role in certain cases.
 Three genders: masculine, feminine and neuter. 
 Two numbers: singular and plural.

Comparative vocabulary list

See also
Adolphe Stoeber

Notes
 When Amish communities become too big, a number of families move away and form a new settlement, which is referred to as a daughter settlement. The settlement from which they leave is the mother settlement.

References

Sources
 Marthe Philipp and Arlette Bothorel-Witz. 1990. Low Alemannic. In Charles V. J. Russ (ed.), The Dialects of modern German: a linguistic survey, 313–336. Routledge.
  François Héran, et al. (2002) "La Dynamique des langues en France au fil du XXe siècle". Population et sociétés 376, Ined.
 Le système ORTHAL 2016 – Orthographe alsacienne - Quelques règles de base pour faciliter l’écriture et la lecture de l’alsacien dans toutes ses variantes », Jérôme Do Bentzinger, 2016
 
 Brunner, Jean-Jacques. L'Alsacien sans peine. ASSiMiL, 2001. 
 Jung, Edmond. Grammaire de L'Alsacien. Dialecte de Strasbourg avec indications historiques. 1983. Straßburg: Ed. Oberlin.
 Laugel-Erny, Elsa. Cours d'alsacien. Les Editions du Quai, 1999.
 Matzen, Raymond, and Léon Daul. Wie Geht's ? Le Dialecte à la portée de tous La Nuée Bleue, 1999. 
 Matzen, Raymond, and Léon Daul. Wie Steht's ? Lexiques alsacien et français, Variantes dialectales, Grammaire La Nuée Bleue, 2000. 
 Steible, Lucie. Le contrôle temporel des consonnes occlusives de l’alsacien et du français parlé en Alsace. Linguistique. Université de Strasbourg, 2014.
 Rünneburger, Henri. Dictionnaire alsacien-francais. 3 vols. Hamburg: Baar 2021 (100.000 lemmata).

External links 

Articles in Alsatian on the Alemannic/Swiss German edition of Wikipedia
 Euromosaic: The status of Germanic languages in France (on website of Universitat Oberta de Catalunya).
 Alsatian placenames
 Wörterbuch der elsässischen Mundarten  
 Alsatian artists
 Webschnuffler, article in the Frankfurter Allgemeine Zeitung on new versions of Microsoft programs in Alsatian  
 Office pour la langue et les cultures d'Alsace et de Moselle 
 Alsatian dictionary  

Alemannic German language
German dialects
Languages of Alsace
Languages of France